Ashraful Huda is a former Bangladesh police officer who served as the Inspector General of Police of Bangladesh Police during 2004–2005.

Career
Huda served as the principal of Bangladesh Police Academy from 1996 to 1997.

Huda took charge the Commissioner of Dhaka Metropolitan Police (DMP) on 8 April 2003 after his retirement as deputy inspector general of police. He left the position of IGP when his contract expired on 7 April 2005.

2004 Dhaka grenade attack case
Huda was serving as the Dhaka Metropolitan Police commissioner during the incident of 2004 Dhaka grenade attack that killed 19 and injured over 200 others. He went abroad on the day of the attack. In July 2011, 30 people were added to the supplementary charge sheets of the grenade attack case which included Huda's name. Huda had appealed to a Dhaka court to discharge him from the cases twice in August and November the same year, but they were rejected. In March 2012, Huda was charged and faced up to life-term imprisonment. He was granted bail the next month.

Personal life
Huda is married to Hamida Khatun. His mother-in-law Zubaydah Khatun belonged to the Zamindar family of Gunahar. They have a son named Shamsul Huda Romel. He was jailed by the Chief Metropolitan Magistrate (CMM) Court in Dhaka in 2015 in connection with a Yaba pills case.

References

Living people
Inspectors General of Police (Bangladesh)
Place of birth missing (living people)
Date of birth missing (living people)
Year of birth missing (living people)
Bangladeshi male criminals